(born 25 January 1967) is a Japanese former professional racing cyclist. In his active years, he represented Japan in the 1992 Summer Olympics, with his 21st-place finish in the road race being the highest for a Japanese rider to date in that event. He became Japanese national champion in the road race in 1998 and 1999 and retired in 2002.

Major results

1994
 1st Tour de Okinawa
1995
 1st Affoltern am Albis
1997
 1st Tour de Okinawa
1998
 1st  Road race, National Road Championships
 2nd Tour de Okinawa
1999
 1st  Road race, National Road Championships

References

External links

Team Bridgestone Anchor (official site, Japanese)

1967 births
Living people
Japanese male cyclists
People from Tokyo
Cyclists at the 1992 Summer Olympics
Olympic cyclists of Japan
Cyclists at the 1998 Asian Games
Asian Games competitors for Japan